Cartmel Fell is a hamlet and a civil parish in the South Lakeland district of Cumbria, England. In the 2001 census the parish had a population of 309, increasing at the 2011 census to 329. The village of Cartmel and Cartmel Priory are not in this parish but in  Lower Allithwaite, to the south: Cartmel Fell church is about 7 miles north of Cartmel Priory.

The neighbouring civil parishes are Windermere parish to the north west, where the boundary includes some of the shore line of the lake, Windermere; Crook to the north east; Crosthwaite and Lyth to the east; Witherslack to the south east; Lindale and Newton-in-Cartmel to the south; and Staveley-in-Cartmel to the south west.

St. Anthony's Church was built as a chapel of ease for Cartmel Priory in  about 1504, and has changed little since.  It contains some 17th-century box pews and a rare three-decker pulpit of 1698 as well as stained glass which may have come from Cartmel Priory.

There was a school next to St Anthony's Church that opened in 1871 and closed in 1971. The building is now the parish hall.

There are 34 listed buildings in the parish. The church and two 1890s houses by C.F.A. Voysey (Broadleys and Moor Crag) are Grade I listed; Hodge Hill is Grade II* and the remaining houses, barns, bridge etc. are Grade II.

A mile to the north-east, the Grade II* listed Cowmire Hall (in the parish of Crosthwaite and Lyth) incorporates a 16th-century pele tower, whilst the main block of the house dates from the 17th century. Also of note is Chapel House, Ravensbarrow Lodge, and Danes Court Cottage.

Cartmel Fell is the subject of a chapter of Wainwright's book The Outlying Fells of Lakeland. He says that the cairn is locally known as Ravensbarrow or Rainsbarrow Old Man. To the northwest is Heights Tarn, a small lake on private land.

See also

Listed buildings in Cartmel Fell

References

External links
 Cumbria County History Trust: Cartmel Fell (nb: provisional research only – see Talk page)

Fells of the Lake District
Mountains and hills of Cumbria
Villages in Cumbria
Civil parishes in Cumbria